Chloropaschia is a genus of snout moths. It was described by George Hampson in 1906 and is known from Brazil and Venezuela.

Species
 Chloropaschia adesia
 Chloropaschia afflicta
 Chloropaschia agathoa
 Chloropaschia aniana
 Chloropaschia brithvalda
 Chloropaschia canities
 Chloropaschia epipodia
 Chloropaschia fabianalis
 Chloropaschia fiachnalis
 Chloropaschia godrica
 Chloropaschia granitalis (C. Felder, R. Felder & Rogenhofer, 1875)
 Chloropaschia hemileuca
 Chloropaschia hollandalis Schaus, 1925
 Chloropaschia lascerianalis
 Chloropaschia lativalva (Amsel, 1956)
 Chloropaschia mennusalis
 Chloropaschia nadena
 Chloropaschia pegalis
 Chloropaschia possidia
 Chloropaschia rufibasis
 Chloropaschia selecta
 Chloropaschia thermalis Hampson, 1906
 Chloropaschia venantia

References

Epipaschiinae
Pyralidae genera